Sorkhan Kalateh (also Romanized as Sorkhan Kalāteh) is a city and capital of Baharan District, in Gorgan County, Golestan Province, Iran. At the 2006 census its population was 6,507, in 1,794 families.

References 

Populated places in Gorgan County
Cities in Golestan Province